The 1963 Southern Illinois Salukis football team was an American football team that represented Southern Illinois University (now known as Southern Illinois University Carbondale) as an independent during the 1963 NCAA College Division football season.  Under fifth-year head coach Carmen Piccone, the team compiled a 4–5 record. The team played its home games at McAndrew Stadium in Carbondale, Illinois. The Salukis game against North Texas State scheduled for November 23 at Fouts Field was canceled in deference to the assassination of John F. Kennedy which occurred the previous day at Dallas.

Schedule

References

Southern Illinois
Southern Illinois Salukis football seasons
Southern Illinois Salukis football